The LOS40 Music Awards 2019 was the fourteenth edition of the LOS40 Music Awards, the annual awards organized by Spanish radio station Los 40. It was held on November 8, 2019, in the WiZink Center in Madrid, Spain.

Performances
The full lineup of performers was announced on October 3, 2019, whilst Sam Smith's performance was revealed on October 30.

Awards and nominations
Nominations were announced on September 12, 2019.

Artist of the Year
 Leiva
 Aitana
 Manuel Carrasco
 Rosalía
 David Bisbal

New Artist of the Year
 Beret
 Lola Indigo
 Pol Granch
 Sinsinati
 Don Patricio

Album of the Year
 Rosalía - El mal querer
 Manuel Carrasco - La cruz del mapa
 Blas Cantó - Complicado
 Leiva - Nuclear
 Dani Fernández - Incendios

Song of the Year
 Dvicio & Taburete - 5 sentidos
 Beret - Lo siento
 Alejandro Sanz & Camila Cabello - Mi Persona Favorita
 Aitana - Vas a quedarte
 Manuel Carrasco - Qué bonito es querer

Video of the Year
 Leiva - No te preocupes por mí
 Rosalía, J Balvin & El Guincho - Con altura
 Vanesa Martín - De tus ojos
 Macaco - Bailo la pena
 Aitana & Lola Indigo - Me quedo

Festival, Tour or Concert of the Year
 Manuel Carrasco - Gira La cruz del mapa
 Alejandro Sanz - #LaGira
 Vanesa Martín - Gira Todas las mujeres que habitan en mí
 Leiva - Tour Nuclear
 A Summer Story Festival

International Artist of the Year
 Rita Ora
 Jonas Brothers
 Sam Smith
 Miley Cyrus
 Ed Sheeran

International New Artist of the Year
 Ava Max
 Panic! at the Disco
 Mabel
 Lil Nas X
 Billie Eilish

International Album of the Year
 Jonas Brothers - Happiness Begins
 Ed Sheeran - No.6 Collaborations Project
 Mark Ronson - Late Night Feelings
 Billie Eilish - When We All Fall Asleep, Where Do We Go?
 Ariana Grande - Thank U, Next

International Song of the Year
 Ava Max - Sweet but Psycho
 Shawn Mendes & Camila Cabello - Señorita
 Panic! at the Disco - High Hopes
 Jonas Brothers - Sucker
 Ed Sheeran & Justin Bieber - I Don't Care

International Video of the Year
 Mark Ronson & Miley Cyrus - Nothing Breaks Like a Heart
 Sofía Reyes feat. Rita Ora & Anitta - R.I.P.
 Billie Eilish - Bad Guy
 Jonas Brothers - Sucker
 Mabel - Don't Call Me Up

LOS40 Urban Award
 J Balvin
 Juan Magan
 Daddy Yankee
 Anitta
 Nicky Jam

LOS40 Global Show Award
 Rosalía, J Balvin & El Guincho - Con altura
 Pedro Capó & Farruko - Calma (Remix)
 Paulo Londra - Adán y Eva
 Daddy Yankee & Snow - Con Calma
 DJ Snake feat. Selena Gomez, Ozuna & Cardi B - Taki Taki

Del 40 al 1 Artist Award
 Aitana
 Bombai
 Ana Guerra
 Alfred García
 Morat

Golden Music Awards
 Sam Smith
 Amaral
 Laura Pausini
 Estopa

Incidents
Actor César Vicente appeared on the stage to present the award for the Song of the Year in an apparent state of inebriation. He was hardly able to read the script and called for "those who come from an after" to say hello. Fellow actress Ester Expósito, who was co-presenting the award with him, tried to get him to focus on the task at hand as the crowd in attendance booed Vicente off the stage. At another point in the show, Javier Calvo admitting to having "drunk a lot" when he was presenting an award alongside partner Javier Ambrossi. César Vicente later attributed it to his "nerves" and admitted he had drunk "3 [glasses of] wine", while at the same time denied accusations of drug consumption.

The ceremony was also criticized for constant sound issues, the most notable one occurring during Sofía Reyes' performance when the show had to be stopped for five minutes because two tracks were playing at the same time.

References

Los Premios 40 Principales
2019 music awards